Dominique Frances Eade (June 16, 1958) is an American jazz singer and composer. She has taught at the New England Conservatory.

Career
She attended Vassar College and the Berklee College of Music before finishing her degree at New England Conservatory in Boston in 1984. Eade was in a jazz band with Joe McPhee called Naima in the 1990s. In 1989 she became the first jazz performer to be awarded the New England Conservatory's NEC Artist Diploma.

Discography 
 The Ruby & The Pearl (Accurate, 1990)
 My Resistance Is Low (Accurate, 1995)
 The Sky Has Melted Away with André Vida and Brandon Evans (1995)
 When the Wind Was Cool (RCA, 1997)
 The Long Way Home (RCA Victor/BMG, 1999)
Open with Jed Wilson (Jazz Project, 2006)
 Whirlpool with Ran Blake (Jazz Project, 2011)
 Town and Country with Ran Blake (Sunnyside, 2017)

References

External links
 Official site

1958 births
Living people
Singers from London
American women jazz singers
American jazz singers
American music educators
Vassar College alumni
American women composers
American jazz composers
Women music educators
21st-century American women